Achille Schelstraete (31 January 1897 – 7 December 1937) was a Belgian footballer. He competed in the men's tournament at the 1924 Summer Olympics.

References

External links

1897 births
1937 deaths
Belgian footballers
Belgium international footballers
Olympic footballers of Belgium
Footballers at the 1924 Summer Olympics
Footballers from Bruges
Association football midfielders
Cercle Brugge K.S.V. players